Uliga (Marshallese:) is an island district in the Marshall Islands, located in the eastern portion of Majuro Atoll. Along with Delap and Djarrit, it forms a town  known as  "Delap-Uliga-Djarrit".

The terrain is about 2 metres above sea level. Variant forms of spelling for Majuro Uliga exist in several different languages: Urego To, Uliga Island, Vuleka, Ulika, Ulliga, Urega-tō, Uliga Island, Ulika, Ulliga, Urega-to, Urega-tō, Urego To, Vuleka.

On January 30, 1944, United States troops invaded and built a large base, Naval Base Majuro.

Climate

References

Populated places in the Marshall Islands
Majuro